Eilema cohabitans is a moth of the subfamily Arctiinae. It was described by Hervé de Toulgoët in 1960. It is found on Madagascar.

References

cohabitans
Moths described in 1960